CA60, CA-60, or CA 60 may refer to:

California State Route 60
Calcium-60 (Ca-60 or 60Ca), an isotope of calcium
Caproni Ca.60, an Italian aircraft, a prototype of a flying boat